USMS may refer to:

 United States Mail Service
 United States Maritime Service
 United States Marshals Service
 U.S. Masters Swimming
 University School of Management Studies